Atomic, Living in Dread and Promise is a documentary film about nuclear history directed by Mark Cousins and Produced by Heather Croall, Mark Atkin and John Archer.  It uses only archive footage to explore life and death in the atomic age. The band Mogwai created the original soundtrack. The film, with a live performance by Mogwai, closed the Edinburgh International Festival in 2016. It was then shown on BBC Storyville to mark 70 years since the bombing of Hiroshima.
The soundtrack was subsequently reworked by Mogwai into a studio album, Atomic.

The film 
Mark Cousins' montage explores the bombings of Hiroshima and Nagasaki, the Chernobyl disaster, Fukushima disaster, and the Three Mile Island accident. There are also protests: the Aldermaston marches and Greenham Common Women's Peace Camp. The Cold War also features.

The subject matter was particularly relevant to Scotland following the independence referendum, which highlighted the issue of nuclear weapons at Faslane as part of the UK's Trident nuclear programme.

Footage used in the film also shows the benefits of atomic science, such as the X-ray and MRI scans.

References 

BBC television documentaries
British television documentaries
British documentary films
2015 documentary films
2015 films
Documentary films about science
Documentary films about the history of science
BBC television documentaries about science
Documentary films about nuclear technology
Documentary films about nuclear war and weapons
Documentary films about historical events
Documentary films about disasters
Films directed by Mark Cousins
Films scored by Mogwai
2015 television films
2010s English-language films
2010s British films

External links